The following are the winners of the 8th annual ENnie Awards, held in 2008:

External links
 2008 ENnie Awards

 
ENnies winners